Stanley Bayly (7 February 1868 – 16 June 1937) was a South African cricketer. He played in three first-class match for Border in 1897/98.

See also
 List of Border representative cricketers

References

External links
 

1868 births
1937 deaths
South African cricketers
Border cricketers
Sportspeople from Qonce